George Fernandez is a retired American soccer defender who played professionally in the Major Indoor Soccer League and National Professional Soccer League.  He coached in both the Continental Indoor Soccer League and NPSL and was the 1994 CISL Coach of the Year.

Playing career

Youth
Born in San Francisco, Fernandez spent much of his youth in Hawaii.  He played both soccer and football in high school and was offered a football scholarship by the University of the Pacific but chose to attend Cal State Hayward instead.  Fernandez played soccer at Hayward from 1979 to 1983.  He was a 1982 and 1983 NCAA Division II First Team All American and has been inducted into the CSU East Bay Athletic Hall of Fame.

Professional
In 1983, the Chicago Sting of the North American Soccer League drafted Fernandez but he did not sign with them.  In October 1983, the Tacoma Stars had the first selection in the Major Indoor Soccer League Draft but swapped their pick with the Cleveland Force.  The Force used the pick to select Fernandez.  Fernandez played only six games over two seasons with the Force before being released in October 1985.  On December 27, 1985, the Los Angeles Lazers for the remainder of the season.  He ended up playing two seasons in Los Angeles.  In 1987, Fernandez joined the San Diego Sockers as a free agent.  On July 30, 1990, he moved to the Cleveland Crunch as a free agent. In 1992, the Crunch moved to the National Professional Soccer League.  In 1994, he became the head coach of the Anaheim Splash in the Continental Indoor Soccer League.  NPSL rules prohibited players and coaches from the CISL to compete in the NPSL.  Therefore, the Crunch released Fernandez.  In 1995, he returned to the NPSL when he signed with the Cincinnati Silverbacks.

National team
In 1981, he played two games with the United States U-20 men's national soccer team at the 1981 FIFA World Youth Championship.   He was a member of the United States national futsal team at both the 1992 and 1996 FIFA Futsal World Championship.

Coaching career
In 1994, Fernandez became the head coach of the Anaheim Splash of the Continental Indoor Soccer League.  He took the team, to the second best record in the league and was named the 1994 CISL Coach of the Year.  In September 1996, Fernandez became a player-coach with the Cincinnati Silverbacks.  He coached the Silverbacks for two seasons.  In September 1998, the Buffalo Blizzard hired Fernandez.  The team fired him on March 1, 2000.  He then moved to the Cleveland Crunch as an assistant coach.  When the Crunch fired head coach Bruce Miller in March 2001, Fernandez served as interim head coach for the remainder of the season.

Yearly Awards
 CISL Coach of the Year – 1994

References

External links
 articles.latimes.com
 MISL stats
 

1961 births
Living people
American men's futsal players
American soccer coaches
American soccer players
Association football defenders
California State University, East Bay alumni
Cincinnati Silverbacks players
Cleveland Crunch players
Cleveland Force (original MISL) players
Continental Indoor Soccer League coaches
Los Angeles Lazers players
Major Indoor Soccer League (1978–1992) coaches
Major Indoor Soccer League (1978–1992) players
National Professional Soccer League (1984–2001) coaches
National Professional Soccer League (1984–2001) players
San Diego Sockers (original MISL) players
Soccer players from San Francisco
United States men's under-20 international soccer players